Meadow Lake Wind Farm is an 801.25 megawatt (MW) wind farm near Brookston and Chalmers, Indiana, spreading over portions of White, Jasper, and Benton Counties.  It is owned and operated by EDP Renewables North America.  The facility currently has six operational phases, with 414 turbines, and is a prominent feature on both sides of Interstate 65 in western Indiana.

Phase I 

Phase I consisted of .65 MW wind turbines, for a total nameplate capacity of 199.65 MW. Groundbreaking ceremonies occurred on April 14, 2009. Phase I became operational in October 2009.

Horizon built a substation next to an existing AEP substation which was already within the wind farm site area. This allowed the wind farm to connect to the power grid without the need to build lengthy new transmission line at a cost of $1 million per mile.

Phase II 
Meadow Lake II Wind Farm has an installed capacity of 99 MW – enough to power approximately 27,000 average Indiana homes with clean energy. The wind farm, which consists of 66 Acciona AWs-1.5 MW turbines, achieved commercial operation in June 2010.

Phase III 
Meadow Lake III Wind Farm has an installed capacity of 103.5 MW – enough to power approximately 28,000 average Indiana homes with clean energy. The wind farm, which consists of 69 GE Energy SLE-1.5 MW turbines, achieved commercial operation in October 2010.

Phase IV 
Meadow Lake IV Wind Farm has an installed capacity of 98.7 MW – enough to power approximately 27,000 average Indiana homes with clean energy. The wind farm, which achieved commercial operation in October 2010, consists of 47 Suzlon S88-2.1 MW turbines.

Phases V and VI 
Meadow Lake V and VI have installed capacities of 100 MW and 200.4 MW, respectively. Phase V came fully online in 2018 and consists of 50 Vestas V110-2.0 MW turbines.  Phase VI came fully online in 2019 and consists of 61 turbines (12 Vestas V110-2.0 MW wind turbines and 49 Vestas V136-3.6 MW) that include some of the tallest and most powerful in the state.

Future expansion 
In early 2010, an EDP Renewables representative and local renewable energy advocates scouted the Meadow Lake project area for a location to build a visitor center. One possibility was an unused building near the intersection of I-65 and US-231, near where a wind turbine will be installed within the next year.

Environmental impact 
At a planned ultimate nameplate capacity of 1000 MW, EDP Renewables North America claims that Meadow Lake would be one of the largest wind farms in the world. The Environmental Protection Agency (EPA) estimates that such facilities would generate enough electricity to power about 250,000 homes, annually saving 1,684 million gallons of water and eliminating 3.1 million tons of carbon dioxide emissions. Horizon further estimates that Phases I and II should eliminate just under one million tons of carbon dioxide emissions per year.

Phase I spreads over  a ten by six mile area since large wind turbines must be spaced at least 5 to 10 rotor diameters apart to avoid wind shadowing.

Electricity production 

(*)   partial year of operation

See also 

Wind power in Indiana
Benton County Wind Farm
Fowler Ridge Wind Farm

References

External links 

 

Wind farms in Indiana
Buildings and structures in Benton County, Indiana
2009 establishments in Indiana